Marco Alessandrini (born 25 December 1970 in Pescara) is an Italian politician.
 
He is a member of the Democratic Party and he was elected Mayor of Pescara on 8 June 2014. In 2019 he chose to not run for a second term.

See also
2014 Italian local elections
List of mayors of Pescara

References

External links
 
 

1970 births
Living people
Mayors of Pescara
Democratic Party (Italy) politicians